Launi Kay Meili (born June 4, 1963 in Spokane, Washington) is an American sport shooter and Olympic champion from Cheney, Washington. She won a gold medal at the 1992 Summer Olympics in Barcelona.

Following her Olympic career, she coached the all-woman University of Nebraska rifle team to the co-ed NCAA National Championship. In 2008, she was appointed rifle coach at the United States Air Force Academy.

Meili has been inducted into the USA Shooting Hall of fame.

References

External links
 

1963 births
Living people
American female sport shooters
United States Distinguished Marksman
ISSF rifle shooters
Nebraska Cornhuskers rifle coaches
Shooters at the 1988 Summer Olympics
Shooters at the 1992 Summer Olympics
Olympic gold medalists for the United States in shooting
Olympic medalists in shooting
Air Force Falcons rifle coaches
Sportspeople from Spokane, Washington
People from Cheney, Washington
Pan American Games medalists in shooting
Pan American Games gold medalists for the United States
Pan American Games silver medalists for the United States
Shooters at the 1987 Pan American Games
Shooters at the 1991 Pan American Games
Medalists at the 1992 Summer Olympics
Medalists at the 1987 Pan American Games
Medalists at the 1991 Pan American Games
21st-century American women
20th-century American women